The Deportation of the Balkars was the expulsion by the  Soviet government of the entire Balkar population of the North Caucasus to Central Asia on March8, 1944, during World War II. The expulsion was ordered by NKVD chief Lavrentiy Beria after approval by Soviet Premier Joseph Stalin. All the 37,713 Balkars of the Caucasus were deported from their homeland in one day. The crime was a part of a Soviet forced settlement program and population transfer that affected several million members of non-Russian Soviet ethnic minorities between the 1930s and the 1950s. Officially the deportation was a response to the Balkars' supposed collaboration with occupying German forces. Later, in 1989, the Soviet government declared the deportation illegal.

Historical background

In August 1942 five districts of the Kabardino-Balkar Autonomous Soviet Socialist Republic (KBASSR) were occupied by German troops. Nalchik, capital of the KBASSR, was occupied on October24, 1942. When the Soviet military forces withdrew they failed to remove or destroy local factories. Most agricultural resources were also untouched; for example 315,000 sheep, 455,000 cattle and 25,000 horses were left for the advancing Germans. Local authorities attempted to organize several partisan groups, but, as the families of the partisans were not evacuated, these groups fall apart. Only one unit, consisting of 125 people was effective.

In early 1943 the KBASSR was liberated by the Soviet Army. Nalchik was liberated by troops of the 37th army together with local partisans. Despite this, according to Soviet reports in May 1943 there were 44 groups of anti-Soviet rebels, 941 people, on KBASSR territory; these included former Communist Party members.

Causes of deportation

Stalinism 

It is believed that the reason for the deportation of the Balkars, in a broad sense, was the Stalinist system, which depended on the repression of the Soviet people. More specifically Kabarda and Balkaria had acquired a reputation for political unreliability during the repressions of the 1920-30s. During this period, from a Kabardino-Balkarian population of 359,236, 17,000 were arrested for political reasons, 9,547 of them were tried, and 2,184 shot. Repression continued during the prewar and war years. Many notable people were arrested and sentenced: H. Appaev — Chairman of the Chegemsky district Executive Committee, Deputy of the Supreme Soviet of the RSFSR; S. Chumakov — head of the CPSU, A. Mokaev — Chairman of the Presidium of the Supreme Soviet of the KBASSR; A. Nastev — Chairman of the Elbrus District Administration, Deputy of the Supreme Soviet of the USSR. All of them were rehabilitated in the 1950s and 1960s.

Accusations of betrayal 

Head of the NKVD Beria saw only "a small contribution" from the Balkar people in the fight against the Nazis, and even a "betrayal" amounting to a "failure to protect Balkar Republic, Elbrus". Z. D. Kumekhov, an ethnic Kabardinian and First Secretary of Communist Party's Local Committee, sent "a report with descriptions of the current situation in Balkar's areas of the KBASSR". It is believed that it was prepared for him by the NKVD. The paper contained detailed descriptions of the activities of gangs in the KBASSR including collaboration with German troops. Supposedly assisting the Soviet Army, many groups attacked local civilians and farmers. The NKVD reported that there were 1,737 people in these gangs. Kumekhov's report ended with the words "Based on the above, we find it necessary to resolve the issue of the possibility of resettlement of the Balkars outside the KBASSR."

In a top-secret telegram to Stalin, Beria described the necessity of deportation is proved as follows:According to P. M. Polyan deportations, including that of the Balkars, were not preventive actions, but "revenge" for real or imagined war crimes against the Soviet Union.

Deportation

Lavrentiy Beria arrived in Nalchik on 2 March 1944. In the early morning of March 8, 1944, two days earlier than planned, Balkar's population was ordered to get ready to leave their homes. The entire operation lasted about two hours. The entire Balkar population was evicted without exception. 17,000 NKVD troops and 4,000 local agents participated in this operation.

By 9 March, 37,713 Balkars were deported in 14 train convoys. They arrived at their destinations in the Kazakh and Kyrgyz Soviet Socialist Republic by 23 March. After the end of World War II, Karachai and Balkar officers of the Red Army were discharged and later also deported. Official Soviet documents reveal that 562 people died during the deportation.  

Many more died during the harsh years in exile and in labor camps. In total, it is estimated that 7,600 Balkars died as a consequence of the deportation, amounting to 19.82 percent of their entire ethnic group.

Remembrance and legacy 

Stalin's successor, Nikita Khrushchev, delivered a secret speech at the Party Congress on February 24, 1956, condemning these Stalinist deportations. Like the other rehabilitated people, the Balkars were then allowed to return from exile to their homeland. They found their homes and farms pillaged and in ruins. While 64 million roubles were allocated to assist the Balkars in rebuilding their housing, they were never given full financial compensation for their lost property or suffering in exile.

The 1959 Soviet census counted 42,408 Balkars. This is a population 10,000 below what was expected before the deportation. Some Balkars maintain that their status of autonomy is still not resolved.

See also
Deportation of the Chechens and Ingush
Deportation of the Meskhetian Turks
Deportation of the Crimean Tatars
Deportation of the Kalmyks
Deportation of the Karachays
Deportation of the Koreans

References

Sources

1944 in the Soviet Union
Ethnic cleansing in Europe
Balkars
Political repression in the Soviet Union
Russian special forces operations
Mass murder in Asia
Crimes against humanity